In archaeogenetics, the term Ancient North Eurasian (generally abbreviated as ANE) is the name given to an ancestral component that represents a lineage ancestral to the people of the Mal'ta–Buret' culture and populations closely related to them, such as the Upper Palaeolithic individuals from Afontova Gora. ANE ancestry forms its own cluster of genetic diversity within the wider Eurasian populations.

ANE ancestry has spread throughout Eurasia and the Americas in various migrations since the Upper Paleolithic, and more than half of the world's population today derives between 5 to 40% of their genomes from the Ancient North Eurasians. Significant ANE ancestry can be found in the indigenous peoples of the Americas, as well as in regions of Northern Europe, South Asia, Central Asia, and Siberia. It has been suggested that their mythology may have included a narrative, found in both Indo-European and some Native American fables, in which a dog guards the path to the afterlife.

Genetic studies 
The ANE lineage is defined by association with the MA-1, or "Mal'ta boy", the remains of an individual who lived during the Last Glacial Maximum, 24,000 years ago in central Siberia, discovered in the 1920s. Together with the Yana Rhinoceros Horn Site samples, and Afontova Gora individuals, they are collectively referred to as 'Ancient North Siberians', who are distantly related to early West Eurasian hunter-gatherers.

Ancient North Eurasians are described as being deeply related to early 'European hunter-gatherers', and forming their own cluster of genetic diversity within the larger Eurasian gene pool. The formation of the ANE gene pool likely occurred very soon after the divergence of West-Eurasian and East-Eurasian lineages from each other. The oldest ANE-associated sample from the Yana Rhinoceros Horn Site (31,600 BP) in Northeastern Siberia, can be described to have formed from early West-Eurasians, with significant contributions from early East-Eurasians (c. 22% to c. 50%), suggesting early contact in Northeastern Siberia during the Upper Paleolithic period. The 'Western' ancestry component can be described to have diverged from European hunter-gatherers ~38kya, the 'Eastern' ancestry component may be described as a sister lineage of the Paleolithic Tianyuan man, or as deeper East-Eurasian lineage, basal to contemporary East-Eurasians. The Mal'ta–Buret' culture and the Afontova Gora samples display less 'Eastern' admixture, around 18% and 16% respectively. It is suggested that the ANE ancestry among modern human populations was largely contributed from a population linked to Afontova Gora, rather than Malta or Yana.

Grebenyuk et al. summarized that the Ancient North Eurasians descended from the 'Ancient North Siberian' Yana population, which were "Early Upper Paleolithic tribes of hunters" and linked to similar groups associated with "Southern Siberian sites of the same period". These communities of Southern Siberian and Central Asian hunters belonged to one of the earliest migration waves of the anatomically modern humans after the Out-of-Africa migration. The authors summarized that "the initial peopling of Northeastern Asia by the anatomically modern humans could have happened both from West to East and from South to North". Sikora et al. notes that the Ancient North Eurasians are unlikely descedants of the 'Ancient North Siberian' Yana population, but both are being sister lineages sharing a common ancestor. The Malta sample may also have received some 'early Caucasus hunter-gatherer' geneflow (~12%).

By c. 32kya, populations carrying ANE-related ancestry were probably widely distributed across northeast Eurasia. They may have expanded as far as Alaska and the Yukon, but were forced to abandon high latitude regions following the onset of harsher climatic conditions that came with the Last Glacial Maximum.

Populations genetically similar to MA-1 and Afontiva Gora were an important genetic contributor to Native Americans, Europeans, Ancient Central Asians, South Asians, and some East Asian groups, in order of significance.
Lazaridis et al. (2016:10) note "a cline of ANE ancestry across the east-west extent of Eurasia". A 2016 study found that the global maximum of ANE ancestry occurs in modern-day Kets, Mansi, Native Americans, and Selkups. The ancient Bronze-age-steppe Yamnaya and Afanasevo cultures were found to have a significant ANE component at ~25 to 50%. According to Moreno-Mayar et al. 2018 between 14% and 38% of Native American ancestry may originate from gene flow from the Mal'ta–Buret' (ANE) population. This difference is caused by the penetration of posterior "Neo-Siberian" migrations into the Americas, with the lowest percentages of ANE ancestry found in Inuit and Alaskan Natives, as these groups are the result of migrations into the Americas roughly 5,000 years ago. Estimates for ANE ancestry among first wave Native Americans show higher percentages, such as 42% for those belonging to the Andean region in South America. The other gene flow in Native Americans (the remainder of their ancestry) was of an East Asian-related origin, specifically diverged from other East Asians ~30,000 years ago. Gene sequencing of another south-central Siberian people (Afontova Gora-2) dating to approximately 17,000 years ago, revealed similar autosomal genetic signatures to that of Mal'ta boy-1, suggesting that the region was continuously occupied by humans throughout the Last Glacial Maximum.

Genomic studies also indicate that the ANE component was introduced to Western Europe by people related to the Yamnaya culture, long after the Paleolithic. It is reported in modern-day Europeans (10%–20%). Additional ANE ancestry is found in European populations through Paleolithic interactions with Eastern European Hunter-Gatherers, which resulted in populations such as Scandinavian Hunter-Gatherers.

Groups partially derived from the Ancient North Eurasians

Ancient Beringian/Ancestral Native American are specific archaeogenetic lineages, based on the genome of an infant found at the Upward Sun River site (dubbed USR1), dated to 11,500 years ago. The AB and the Ancestral Native American (ANA) lineage formed about 25,000 years ago, and subsequently diverged from each other, with the AB staying in the Beringian region, while the Ancestral Native Americans populated the Americas.

Altai hunter-gatherers is the name given to Middle Holocene Siberian hunter-gatherers within the Altai-Sayan region in Southern Siberia. They originated from the admixture of Paleo-Siberian and Ancient North Eurasian groups and show increased affinity towards Native Americans. Bronze Age groups from North and Inner Asia with significant ANE ancestry (e.g. Lake Baikal hunter-gatherers, Okunevo pastoralists) can be successfully modeled with Altai hunter-gatherers as a proximal ANE-derived ancestry source.

Eastern Hunter-Gatherer (EHG) is a lineage which derived significant ancestry from ANE, ranging between 9% to up to 75%, with the remaining ancestry from a group more closely related to, but distinct from, Western Hunter-Gatherers (WHGs). It is represented by two individuals from Karelia, one of Y-haplogroup R1a-M417, dated c. 8.4 kya, the other of Y-haplogroup J, dated c. 7.2 kya; and one individual from Samara, of Y-haplogroup R1b-P297, dated c. 7.6 kya. After the end of the Last Glacial Maximum, the Western Hunter-Gatherers (WHG) and EHG lineages merged in Eastern Europe, accounting for early presence of ANE-derived ancestry in Mesolithic Europe. Evidence suggests that as Ancient North Eurasians migrated West from Eastern Siberia, they absorbed Western Hunter-Gatherers and other West Eurasian populations as well.

Scandinavian Hunter-Gatherer (SHG) is represented by several individuals buried at Motala, Sweden ca. 6000 BC. They were descended from Western Hunter-Gatherers who initially settled Scandinavia from the south, and received later admixture from EHG who entered Scandinavia from the north through the coast of Norway.

West Siberian Hunter-Gatherer (WSHG) are a specific archaeogenetic lineage, first reported in a genetic study published in Science in September 2019. WSGs were found to be of about 30% EHG ancestry, 50% ANE ancestry, and 20% to 38% East Asian ancestry.

Western Steppe Herders (WSH) is the name given to a distinct ancestral component that represents descent closely related to the Yamnaya culture of the Pontic–Caspian steppe. This ancestry is often referred to as Yamnaya ancestry or Steppe ancestry and formed from EHG and CHG (Caucasus hunter-gatherer).

Late Upper Paeolithic Lake Baikal - Ust'Kyakhta-3 (UKY) 14,050-13,770 BP were mixture of 30% ANE ancestry and 70% East Asian ancestry.

Lake Baikal Holocene - Baikal Eneolithic (Baikal_EN) and Baikal Early Bronze Age (Baikal_EBA) derived 6.4% to 20.1% ancestry from ANE, while rest of their ancestry was derived from East Asians. Fofonovo_EN near by Lake Baikal were mixture of 12-17% ANE ancestry and 83-87% East Asian ancestry.

Jōmon people, the pre-Neolithic population of Japan, mainly derived their ancestry from East Asian lineages, but also received geneflow from the ANE-related "Ancient North Siberians" (represented by samples from the Yana Rhinoceros Horn Site) prior to the migration from the Asian mainland to the Japanese archipelago. Jōmon ancestry is still found among the inhabitants of present-day Japan: most markedly among the Ainu people, who are considered the direct descendants of the Jōmon people, and to a small, but significant degree among the majority of the Japanese population.

Phenotype prediction

Genomic studies by Raghavan et al. (2014) and Fu et al. (2016) suggested that Mal'ta boy may have had brown eyes, and relatively dark hair and dark skin, while cautioning that this analysis was based on an extremely low coverage of DNA that might not give an accurate prediction of pigmentation. Mathieson, et al. (2018) could not determine if Mal'ta 1 boy had the derived allele associated with blond hair in ANE descendants, as they could obtain no coverage for this SNP.

Anthropologic research 
Kozintsev (2020) argues that the historical Southern Siberian Okunevo population, which derives most of their ancestry from Ancient North Eurasians and their closest relatives, as possessing a distinct craniometric phenotype, which he dubbed "Americanoid", which represents the variation of the first humans in Siberia. He further argues that "As the geography and chronology of the ANE component show, it is misleading to describe it as Western Eurasian and associate it solely with ancient Caucasoids. To all appearances, it emerged before the Caucasoid-Mongoloid split."

Zhang et al. (2021)proposed that the 'West-Eurasian' features of the earlier Tarim mummies could be attributed to their Ancient North Eurasian ancestry.

Evolution of blond hair

Single nucleotide polymorphisms of the KITLG gene are associated with blonde hair color in various human populations. One of these polymorphisms is associated with blond hair. The earliest known individual with this allele is a female south-central Siberian ANE individual from Afontova Gora 3 site, which is dated to 16,130-15,749 BCE. Mathieson, et al (2018) thus argued that this gene originated in the Ancient North Eurasian population.

Geneticist David Reich said that the KITLG gene for blond hair probably entered continental Europe in a population migration wave from the Eurasian steppe, by a population carrying substantial Ancient North Eurasian ancestry. Hanel and Carlberg (2020) likewise report that populations bearing Ancient North Eurasian ancestry were responsible for contributing this gene to Europeans.

Comparative mythology 
Since the term 'Ancient North Eurasian' refers to a genetic bridge of connected mating networks, scholars of comparative mythology have argued that they probably shared myths and beliefs that could be reconstructed via the comparison of stories attested within cultures that were not in contact for millennia and stretched from the Pontic–Caspian steppe to the American continent.

For instance, the mytheme of the dog guarding the Otherworld possibly stems from an older Ancient North Eurasian belief, as suggested by similar motifs found in Indo-European, Native American and Siberian mythology. In Siouan, Algonquian, Iroquoian, and in Central and South American beliefs, a fierce guard dog was located in the Milky Way, perceived as the path of souls in the afterlife, and getting past it was a test. The Siberian Chukchi and Tungus believed in a guardian-of-the-afterlife dog and a spirit dog that would absorb the dead man's soul and act as a guide in the afterlife. In Indo-European myths, the figure of the dog is embodied by Cerberus, Sarvarā, and Garmr. In Zoroastrianism, two four-eyed dogs guard the bridge to the afterlife called Chinvat Bridge. Anthony and Brown note that it might be one of the oldest mythemes recoverable through comparative mythology.

A second canid-related series of beliefs, myths and rituals connected dogs with healing rather than death. For instance, Ancient Near Eastern and Turkic-Kipchaq myths are prone to associate dogs with healing and generally categorised dogs as impure. A similar myth-pattern is assumed for the Eneolithic site of Botai in Kazakhstan, dated to 3500 BC, which might represent the dog as absorber of illness and guardian of the household against disease and evil. In Mesopotamia, the goddess Nintinugga, associated with healing, was accompanied or symbolized by dogs. Similar absorbent-puppy healing and sacrifice rituals were practiced in Greece and Italy, among the Hittites, again possibly influenced by Near Eastern traditions.

Steam bath ritual
Sven Kurbel has suggested that, as a result of the high levels of dust in the atmosphere during the Last Glacial Maximum, the Ancient North Eurasians may have developed steam baths to cleanse the skin and respiratory organs, as well as perhaps serving some sort of spiritual function. Kurbel speculates that this may explain why sauna-type steam baths are typical of Northwest European and Native American populations, who perhaps inherited this practice from their Ancient North Eurasian ancestors.

See also
 Western Hunter-Gatherer
 Prehistory of Siberia

References

Notes

Bibliography

 
 

 

 
 
 
 
 

 

 
 

 
 
 

ANE
Genetic history of Europe
Peopling of the world
Peopling of the Americas
Indo-European genetics
Last Glacial Maximum
Mesolithic